Cristian Malmagro Viaña (born 11 March 1983 in Granollers) is a Spanish handballer who plays for CB Ciudad de Logroño. He participated at the 2008 Summer Olympics in Beijing as a member of the Spain men's national handball team. The team won a bronze medal, defeating Croatia.

Achievements    
Danish Handball League:
Winner: 2011, 2012
Danish Handball Cup:
Winner: 2011
Coupe de France:
Winner: 2013
Romanian National League:
Winner: 2015
Romanian Cup:
Winner: 2015
Olympic Games:
Bronze Medalist: 2008

Individual awards
 Liga ASOBAL Player of the Season: 2008

References

External links

1983 births
Sportspeople from Granollers
Spanish male handball players
Handball players at the 2008 Summer Olympics
Olympic handball players of Spain
Olympic bronze medalists for Spain
Living people
Liga ASOBAL players
SDC San Antonio players
Montpellier Handball players
Olympic medalists in handball
Medalists at the 2008 Summer Olympics
Spanish expatriate sportspeople in Denmark
Spanish expatriate sportspeople in France
Spanish expatriate sportspeople in the United Arab Emirates
Spanish expatriate sportspeople in Romania
Expatriate handball players
BM Granollers players
Handball players from Catalonia